() is the (nick)name of various green political parties in French-speaking countries such as:

official name:
Europe Ecology – The Greens, France
The Greens (Benin)
The Greens (France)
The Greens (Luxembourg)
The Greens (Mauritius)

nickname:
Green Party of Canada in Quebec
Green Party of Switzerland
Ecolo in Belgium (active in Wallonia and Brussels)

See also:
Parti écologiste "Les Verts" v European Parliament, a case before the European Court of Justice